Tranquil , is a calm state of mind. 

Tranquil' may also refer to:
Tranquil (horse) (1920–1938), a British Thoroughbred racehorse
Tranquil, Mississippi, a town in the United States
Tranquil Lake, a lake in the South Orkney Islands

See also
Tranquil Star, an Australian Thoroughbred racehorse
 Tranquility (disambiguation)